Carmen-Francesca Banciu (born  October 25, 1955) is a Romanian novelist and lecturer.

Biography
Born in Lipova, Arad County, she was the daughter of a high-ranking Romanian Communist Party and government official. Banciu studied church mural painting and foreign trade at schools in Bucharest.

In 1985, she won the International Short Story Prize of the city of Arnsberg, Germany, an achievement which prompted a publication ban in Romania. In 1990, after the fall of the communist regime in Romania (the Romanian Revolution of 1989), Banciu moved to Berlin, and since 1996, she has not only written in Romanian, but also in German. In addition to writing, she works as a freelance editor and commentator for various news media and regularly teaches seminars on creative writing.

In 2005, Banciu was writer-in-residence at Rutgers University in New Brunswick, New Jersey.

Works
 Manual de Întrebări ("Manual of Questions"), 1984
 Fenster in Flammen ("Windows in Flames", 1992 
 Filuteks Handbuch der Fragen ("Filutek's Manual of Questions"), 1995 
 Vaterflucht ("Flight from Father"), 1998
 Ein Land voller Helden ("A Land Full of Heroes"), 2000
 Berlin ist mein Paris ("Berlin Is My Paris"), 2002
 Deborah (radioplay), 2005
 Das Lied der traurigen Mutter, ("The song of the sad mother"), 2007

Awards
 Arnsberg International Short Story Prize (1985) for Das strahlende Ghetto (trans. "The Beaming Ghetto") 
 Luceafărul Literature Prize

References

External links
 Das strahlende Ghetto ("The Beaming Ghetto") in the Brooklyn Rail (April 2005)
 Carmen-Francesca Banciu on www.rom2.de

1955 births
Living people
People from Lipova, Arad
Romanian dramatists and playwrights
German people of Romanian descent
Romanian novelists
Romanian women short story writers
Romanian short story writers
Romanian women novelists
Women dramatists and playwrights